Grace Greylock Niles was an American botanist, author, and artist.

Biography
Born as Grace Stoddard Niles, she attended Pownal schools and later a private school, which might have been in Herkimer, New York. She returned to Pownal to teach school and to pursue a writing career. In 1902, she published The Origin of Plant Names, adopting Greylock as her middle name (from Mount Greylock and Chief Gray Lock). In 1904, she published Bog-trotting for Orchids with her own illustrations. She continued to publish articles on local history and nature.

By 1921, her behavior became erratic, and she began harassing her neighbors. She seems to have deliberately burned down her own house. A distant relative summoned the Bennington County sheriff, who drove her to the Brattleboro Retreat. There she was incarcerated and died in 1943. Her body was buried in Pownal in the Oak Hill Cemetery.

Her name is honored by the Grace Greylock Niles Trail in the Mountain Meadow Preserve.

Selected publications

Articles

Books

References

1864 births
1943 deaths
American women botanists
Botanists active in North America
People from Pownal, Vermont
19th-century American botanists
20th-century American botanists
19th-century American women writers
20th-century American women writers
19th-century American writers
20th-century American writers
Writers from Vermont
20th-century American women scientists